Flat Creek is a stream in the U.S. state of Washington. It is a tributary of the Columbia River.

Flat Creek most likely was named for the flatness of the nearby terrain.

See also
List of rivers of Washington

References

Rivers of Stevens County, Washington
Rivers of Washington (state)